Ronald Gordon "Bot" Stanley (c. 1900 – c. 1961) was a rugby union player who represented Australia.

Stanley, a centre, was born in Bathurst, New South Wales and claimed a total of 14 international rugby caps for Australia.

References

Australian rugby union players
Australia international rugby union players
Year of birth uncertain
Rugby union players from New South Wales
Rugby union centres